Alexander James Inglis (November 24, 1879 – 1924) was an American author and educator who was instrumental in promoting the "new American" secondary education at the beginning of the 20th century. His scholarship largely shaped modern public schools and continues to be influential.

Biography

Inglis was born in Middletown, Connecticut, to William Grey Inglis (1854–1939) and Susan Beyer Inglis (1858–1915). His father worked at a local gold and silver plating factory for 30 years before taking proprietorship of a laundromat. His grandfather, Alexander Inglis (1815–1893), was a miner who emigrated from Edinburgh, Scotland in 1852. Little is known about his childhood. In 1892, his brother Willie died of diphtheria at the age of six in Newark, New Jersey while visiting their maternal grandparents. He graduated from Middletown High School in 1898 with honors for attendance and academics. Later that year, he enrolled in Wesleyan University. He played varsity baseball and football for four years. His first professional job was as a Latin teacher at The Kiski School, a boarding school in Saltsburg, Pennsylvania, during the 1902–1903 school year. There, he also coached football and assisted with baseball. In 1903, he took a position teaching Latin at the Horace Mann School in Manhattan, New York, where he stayed through 1911. In the summer of 1905, he became a student of the American School of Classical Studies in Pompeii and Rome, Italy. He authored three Latin textbooks while a teacher at Horace Mann, two of which the school added to the curriculum.:

Ideas

According to Principles of Secondary Education, three aims of secondary education are:

Social-Civic Aim – The preparation of the individual as a prospective citizen and cooperating member of society.
Economic-Vocational Aim – The preparation of the individual as a prospective worker and producer.
Individualistic-Avocational Aim – The preparation of the individual for those activities … primarily involving individual action, the use of leisure, and the development of personality.

He summarized his position of what the intent of secondary education should be thusly:

"Many important functions are therein involved, e.g., means of adjusting the individual and his social environment, the development of a "social mind" and social cohesion among groups of individuals, the adjustment of individual differences to the differentiated needs of society, control of the factor of selection in secondary education, educational, moral, social, and vocational guidance."

Influence
The Harvard Graduate School of Education established the Inglis Lectureship in Secondary Education in his honor.

His work was referenced by John Taylor Gatto in his essay, "Against School".

His thought inspired Ellwood Patterson Cubberley and James Bryant Conant.

Bibliography
Key to Pearson's Latin Prose Composition, 1904
First Book in Latin, 1906, with Virgil Prettyman
High School Course in Latin Composition, 1909, with Charles McCoy Baker
Principles of Secondary Education, 1918
Inglis Intelligence Quotient Values, 1921

References 

1879 births
1924 deaths
People from Middletown, Connecticut
20th-century American educators
Wesleyan University alumni